The Prussian T 8 were six-coupled superheated goods tank locomotives of the Prussian state railways. They were originally intended for suburban passenger service in Berlin, and for use on branch lines. Due to their poor running qualities, they were demoted to shunting and short-distance goods train service.

Between 1906 and 1909, one hundred locomotives were built, of which 80 were still in service with Deutsche Reichsbahn in 1923, and 78 in 1925 when they were renumbered in class 89.0 as 89 001 to 078; but due to their poor performance, they were soon sold to private railways.

After World War I, ten locomotives were ceded to Poland, where they became PKP class TKh3.

In 1938, two locomotives were taken back into stock when Lokalbahn AG was nationalised; rather than restoring the locomotives' old numbers, they were allocated new ones: 89 1001 and 1002.

The last DR locomotive was retired in 1965; the last Deutsche Bundesbahn locomotive was a Werklok (works locomotive) which was retired in 1964.

Preservation
One locomotive has been preserved at the : 89 1004, ex MFWE 4 (second), formerly 89 001.

Notes

References

Further reading

T 08
0-6-0T locomotives
Railway locomotives introduced in 1906
Linke-Hofmann locomotives
Orenstein & Koppel locomotives
Hanomag locomotives
Standard gauge locomotives of Germany
Standard gauge locomotives of Poland
C h2t locomotives
Freight locomotives